Stack is a tool to build Haskell projects and manage their dependencies. It uses the Cabal library but with a curated version of the Hackage repository called Stackage. 

Stack competes against Cabal's binary cabal-install  and has been created as a result of the overall criticism about dependency problems. It does not, however, provide its own package format, but uses existing *.cabal files and complements projects with an additional stack.yaml file.

References

Free software programmed in Haskell
Free package management systems
Software using the BSD license